= Current Problems in Surgery =

- Discipline: Surgery
- Language: English
- Edited by: Stanley W. Ashley

Publication details
- History: 1964–present
- Publisher: Elsevier
- Frequency: Monthly
- Impact factor: 2.815 (2021)

Standard abbreviations
- ISO 4: Curr. Probl. Surg.

Indexing
- ISSN: 0011-3840

Links
- Journal homepage

Current Problems in Surgery is a monthly peer-reviewed academic journal of surgery published by Elsevier. According to the Journal Citation Reports, the journal has a 2021 impact factor of 2.815.
